Alexandrovka is a rural locality (a khutor) in Krinichenskoye Rural Settlement, Ostrogozhsky District, Voronezh Oblast, Russia. The population was 177 as of 2010. There are 6 streets.

Geography 
Alexandrovka is located 25 km northeast of Ostrogozhsk (the district's administrative centre) by road. Krinitsa is the nearest rural locality.

References 

Rural localities in Ostrogozhsky District